James Arthur Ainscow Stockwin OBE (born 28 November 1935) is a British political scientist who is a specialist in the politics and foreign policy of Japan.

Early life
Arthur Stockwin was born in Birmingham. He obtained a BA in Philosophy, Politics and Economics from the University of Oxford and a PhD in International Relations from the Australian National University in Canberra. His thesis was titled "The Neutralist Policy of the Japanese Socialist Party".

Honours
In 2004, he was presented with The Order of the Rising Sun, Gold Rays with Neck Ribbon by ambassador to London Yoshiji Nogami on behalf of the Emperor of Japan for his efforts to promote Japanese Studies in the United Kingdom.

In 2006, a festschrift was published in his honour, The Left in the Shaping of Japanese Democracy: Essays in Honour of J.A.A. Stockwin, edited by David Williams and Rikki Kersten.

He was awarded the Order of the British Empire in 2009 for "services to academic excellence and the promotion of UK-Japanese understanding".

Selected publications
The Japanese Socialist Party and Neutralism (1968)
Governing Japan (1975, 1982, 1989, 2008)
Dynamic and Immobilist Politics in Japan (editor and part-author, 1988)
Dictionary of the Modern Politics of Japan (2003)
The Writings of J.A.A. Stockwin (2 vols., 2012)

References

Further reading
Williams, David, & Rikki Kersten. (Eds.) (2006) The Left in the Shaping of Japanese Democracy: Essays in Honour of J.A.A. Stockwin. Abingdon: Routledge. 

Living people
1937 births
Academic staff of the Australian National University
Alumni of the University of Oxford
Australian National University alumni
People from Birmingham, West Midlands
British political scientists
Fellows of St Antony's College, Oxford
Recipients of the Order of the Rising Sun
Members of the Order of the British Empire